Joshua Chibi Dariye (born 27 July 1957) assumed office as the Governor of Plateau State, Nigeria on 29 May 1999 during the 1999 Plateau State gubernatorial election on the platform of the People's Democratic Party (PDP). He was re-elected for another four-year term starting in May 2003, and was impeached in November 2006 though the impeachment was nullified by the Nigerian appeal court in 27 March 2007, a decision upheld by the Supreme Court the following month effectively returning Dariye to office for the remainder of his tenure.

Background
In Horop, Mushere, Bokkos Local Government Area of Plateau State. Dariye was a businessman before becoming a politician. He was a strong mobilizer for the election of President Olusegun Obasanjo in the People's Democratic Party Primaries in 1999 as well as Obasanjo's re-election in 2003. At a regional level, he has chaired the Governors' forum of the States in Northern Nigeria.

Political life

Governor
During his time as governor, he was arrested in London, England on 20 January 2004, with large sums of money. Serving governors have immunity from criminal prosecution and the Economic and Financial Crimes Commission (EFCC), an anti corruption agency of the Federal Government of Nigeria established to check corrupt practices was waiting for 2007 when his term in office would end to charge him to court for money laundering. He was accused of stealing about $9m of public funds and of money laundering.

Impeachment
In early October 2006, eight of the twenty-four state assembly members issued an impeachment notice against Dariye. In his defence, he stated that the notice was invalid as the eight did not form a quorum of the assembly as required by the law. A crowd of Dariye's supporters tried to prevent the assembly members from entering the state assembly building. Riot police then fired into the crowd, killing two protestors.

Dariye was impeached on 13 November 2006. His deputy, Michael Botmang, became the new governor. On 10 March 2007, after a Court of Appeal ordered Dariye reinstated as governor, the Plateau State Government announced its intention to appeal to the Supreme Court.

Following his reinstatement, Dariye's term of office as Governor of Plateau State concluded on 29 May 2007.

Senator
In April 2011, Dariye was elected Senator for Plateau Central Senatorial District on the Labour Party platform. He received 189,140 votes, defeating Dawuda Gowon of the PDP, younger brother of former head of state Yakubu Gowon, who received 160,106 votes.

On 28 March 2015, he was re-elected as senator representing  Plateau central senatorial district after polling 189,150 votes

Criminal trial 
Nigeria's anti-corruption agency, the Economic and Financial Crimes Commission (EFCC), in 2007, preferred 23 counts of money laundering involving alleged diversion of about N1.126billion Plateau State Government's ecological funds against Dariye.

The charges were filed before a Federal Capital Territory High Court in Abuja against Dariye.  He pleaded not guilty to the charges following which the trial judge, Justice Adebukola Banjoko, fixed 13 November 2007 for the commencement of trial.

But before that date, Dariye filed an application, challenging the competence of the charges and the jurisdiction of the court. He argued that he ought to be tried before a Plateau State High Court and not the FCT High Court.

On 13 December 2007, the trial judge heard and dismissed Dariye's application for lacking in merit. Dariye appealed against the ruling of the court. But the Abuja Division of the  Court of Appeal affirmed the decision of Justice Banjoko. Dariye subsequently appealed to the Supreme Court.

But the apex court, on 27 February 2015 dismissed Dariye's appeal and ordered him to submit himself for trial.

Trial resumes  the Supreme Court's judgment delivered on 27 February 2015, the former Plateau State Governor's trial resumed after about nine years of delay on 26 January 2016.  The EFCC called its first prosecution witness, Musa Sunday, who is a detective with the anti-graft agency and who was involved in the investigation of Dariye for the alleged crime. Sunday, during his testimony before Justice Banjoko gave a breakdown of his team's report of investigation revealing how the ecological funds obtained by Dariye, as then governor of Plateau State, was allegedly diverted.

Conviction
The High Court of the Federal Capital Territory, Gudu, Abuja, on Tuesday 12 June 2018 sentenced Dariye to 14 years’ imprisonment on the charges of criminal breach of trust and misappropriation of funds (1.6 billion naira) while he was the Governor of Plateau state. The sentence was then appealed and eventually the Supreme Court gave a final verdict of a 10 years sentence for the offence committed.

Reduction of jail term
The Court of Appeal sitting in Abuja on Friday 16 November 2018 reduced the 14-year sentence against Dariye to 10 years’. The presiding judge of the court, Justice Stephen Adah, reduced the charges in the counts to 10 years, while the terms with two years are reduced to one year each. The sentences are to run concurrently.

Pardon
On 14 April, the federal government of Nigeria granted Joshua Dariye and Jolly Nyame a presidential pardon. The action was criticised by civil society organisations and the general public.

Released 
Following pardon approved by the council of state, led by the President, Muhammadu Buhari (retd.), had on 14 April.

Now Former Governor of Plateau State, Senator Joshua Dariye, and a former Taraba State Governor, Jolly Nyame, and others have been released from Kuje prison.

Personal life
Dariye is married to Valentina and together they have four children namely Nanle, Joy, Ebenezer and Ruth.

See also
List of Governors of Plateau State

References

1957 births
Living people
Governors of Plateau State
Peoples Democratic Party state governors of Nigeria
Members of the Senate (Nigeria)
Plateau State
Nigerian politicians convicted of corruption